Joseph Aaron Pechman (April 2, 1918 – August 19, 1989) was a highly influential economist and taxation scholar in the United States. He graduated from the City College of New York and the University of Wisconsin–Madison. He served as president of the American Economic Association and was a fellow of the American Academy of Arts and Sciences. He was also a senior fellow at the Brookings Institution.

Core Ideas 
Pechman advocated income taxation, progressive tax rates, and tax reform. He was a major figure in the Tax Reform Act of 1986.

Scholarship 
A prolific author, Pechman published influential books such as "Gender in the Workplace" and "How Taxes Affect Economic Behavior".

Personal life 
Pechman was born in Borowie, Poland, in 1918. Pechman was married and had two daughters, Ellen Pechman and Jane Pechman Stern.

References 

University of Wisconsin–Madison alumni
American people of Polish descent
Tax reform
1918 births
1989 deaths
20th-century American economists
Presidents of the American Economic Association
Distinguished Fellows of the American Economic Association